de Volkskrant (The People's Paper) is a Dutch daily morning newspaper. Founded in 1919, it has a nationwide circulation of about 250,000.

Formerly a leading centre-left Catholic broadsheet, de Volkskrant today is a medium-sized centrist compact. Pieter Klok is the current editor-in-chief.

History and profile

De Volkskrant was founded in 1919 and has been a daily morning newspaper since 1921. Originally de Volkskrant was a Roman Catholic newspaper closely linked to the Catholic People's Party and the Catholic pillar. The paper temporarily ceased publication in 1941.

On its re-founding in 1945, its office moved from Den Bosch to Amsterdam. It became a left-wing newspaper in the 1960s, but began softening its stance in 1980. On 23 August 2006 the Volkskrant published its 25,000th edition.

In 1968, the ownership of De Volkskrant and Het Parool merged into a new parent, De Perscombinatie. Het Parool gained control due to the larger investment in the parent. De Perscombinatie started joint printing. In 1975, Trouw joined. In 1994 De Perscombinatie acquired Uitgeverij Meulenhoff & Co and became PCM Uitgevers. In 1995 PCM acquired the larger Nederlandse Dagblad Unie, owners of the Algemeen Dagblad en NRC Handelsblad. In 1996 it acquired the Volkskrant. PCM was acquired in 2009 by De Persgroep from Belgium and in December 2009 renamed De Persgroup Nederland, now DPG Media Nederland.

In 2010, Pieter Broertjes completed his 20-year tenure as editor-in-chief. In 2013 de Volkskrant was awarded the European Newspaper of the Year in the category of nationwide newspapers.

In October 2006, Volkskrant announced it intended to start publishing a free version of its paper, targeting young people. As PCM gave no permission this never happened.

Circulation
In 2001 the circulation of De Volkskrant was 335,000 copies. The daily circulation of the paper was 326,000 copies in 2002, dwindling to some 235,000 in 2011. The paper has since then heavily lost circulation. 

Print circulation remains the third of the Netherlands, after De Telegraaf and Algemeen Dagblad.

Typeface
The typeface Capitolium News by Gerard Unger (2006) has been the main type used in de Volkskrant since 2 December 2006.

References

External links

  (in Dutch)

1919 establishments in the Netherlands
Dutch-language newspapers
Mass media in Amsterdam
Daily newspapers published in the Netherlands
Newspapers established in 1919